Purui River is a river of Colombia. It is part of the Amazon River basin.

See also
List of rivers of Colombia

References
Rand McNally, The New International Atlas, 1993.

Rivers of Colombia